Karl Walter Lindenlaub,  (born 19 June 1957) is a German cinematographer. He is best known for his collaborations with director Roland Emmerich on films such as Stargate and Independence Day, as well as feature films such as The Haunting, The Princess Diaries, and Ninja Assassin. He has been nominated for 1 Primetime Emmy Award for his work on the miniseries two-part miniseries Houdini.

Filmography
Film

Television

References

German cinematographers
Living people
1957 births
Film people from Bremen (state)